"I Believe" is a song recorded by American country music singer George Strait. It was written by Strait, his son Bubba, and Dean Dillon.  It was released on July 15, 2013, as the second single from his album Love Is Everything.

Content
Strait and his band were finished recording the album when Norma, George's wife, made everyone unpack and cut the Newtown, Connecticut-inspired single "At its core, ‘I Believe’ is about faith — a subject this singer has approached with underrated deftness" and "puts his faith on display as never before" "Strait was hesitant to include the song, as he didn’t want to misrepresent the families of the victims or be accused of somehow profiting from their tears... his sincerity triumphs on this beautifully crafted tribute to the victims." The victims that inspired this song where the lives taken from a school shooting in Newtown Connecticut in December 2012.

Critical reception
Billy Dukes of Taste of Country rated "I Believe" 4.5 out of 5 stars and calls it "arguably the best of the 13" and shouldn't keep him from earning a Song of the Year consideration.

Leeann Ward of Country Universe gave the song an A. She states, "Strait’s voice is as solid as ever" and that "he perfectly emotes the sincerity and compassion that a song of this magnitude requires." She finishes by saying "I Believe" is "just a tribute from a humble man conveying a simple sentiment of real heartbreak, buoyed by faith and hope."

Chart performance
"I Believe" debuted and peaked at number 50 on the U.S. Billboard Country Airplay chart for the week of August 3, 2013, making it the first single of Strait's career to miss the Top 40.

Later uses
Performed as the last song of Hand in Hand: A Benefit for Hurricane Relief it was, by Strait and others, in September 2017, in the wake of Hurricane Harvey and Hurricane Irma.

References

External links

2013 singles
George Strait songs
Songs written by Dean Dillon
Songs written by George Strait
Song recordings produced by Tony Brown (record producer)
MCA Nashville Records singles
2013 songs